Opogona stereodyta (previously known as Lozostoma stereodyta) is a moth of the family Tineidae. It is found in southern Australia.

The adult moth of this species has yellow forewings each with a brown patch by the tornus and a transverse brown bar. The wingspan is about 1.3 cms.

References

Opogona
Moths of Australia
Moths described in 1897